Walther Forstmann (9 March 1883 – 2 November 1973) was one of the most highly decorated U-boat commanders in the Kaiserliche Marine during World War I. He also served in the Kriegsmarine during World War II in different staff positions.

As such, he is the second most successful submarine commander ever (by tonnage sunk), after de la Perière.

World War I
On 12 August 1916 Kapitänleutnant Forstmann of U-39 was awarded the Pour le Mérite for his achievements so far in the First World War.

The ships carried a total load of 31,500 tonnes of coal, of which more than 26,000 tonnes were meant for Italy for use in the winter.

Interbellum
Forstmann wrote his memoirs after the war in the book Hunting in the Mediterranean. In 1921 he qualified as an attorney and in 1924 he became social departmental head and director with the August Thyssen coal company in Duisburg.

From 1929 to 1933 he was a city delegate and parliamentary group leader of the German People's Party in Duisburg.

Between 1933 and 1950 he was a member of the board (1951-1953 member of the supervisory board) of four large housing cooperatives of the Ruhr steel plants.

World War II
In the Second World War Forstmann served as chief of different commands in Osnabrück and Copenhagen. In Copenhagen, he was the commander of the Wehrwirtschaftsstab Denmark, Germany's chief industrial purchasing entity in occupied Denmark. He was promoted to Kapitän zur See on 1 July 1942. He retired from the navy in 1945.

Postwar career

1951 - 1955 He became one of the advisors of the housing company - Rheini dwellings A.G. in Duisburg which was responsible for the movement of several villages to enable development of open cast coal mining. In 1954 he became a member of the supervisory board of this company.

In 1956 he was involved in the design structure of the 30 Pestalozzi villages (de) and became vice-president of the German settler federation, chairman of the executive committee of youth centre place work e. V.

Awards and decorations
 Gold German Sports Badge (1933)
 Iron Cross of 1914, 1st and 2nd class
 Order of Saint Stanislaus, 3rd class
 Hanseatic Cross of Hamburg
 Knights Cross with Swords of the House Order of Hohenzollern
 Order of the Red Eagle 4th Class
 The Honour Cross of the World War 1914/1918
 Pour le Mérite
 U-boat War Badge WW1
 Order of Merit of the Federal Republic of Germany:
 1st class, 1952
 Grand Cross, 3 August 1960 (for his part in the 25-year-old existence of the German settler federation)
 Grand Cross with Star, 9 March 1968

In 1968 he received an honorary Doctorate from the Roman Accademia Tiberina and in 1972 another from the university of the Mediterranean in Rome.

References

1883 births
1973 deaths
Military personnel from Essen
People from the Rhine Province
U-boat commanders (Imperial German Navy)
Recipients of the Pour le Mérite (military class)
Knights Commander of the Order of Merit of the Federal Republic of Germany
Imperial German Navy personnel of World War I
Kriegsmarine personnel